Mor Gaon Mor Desh (2018) is an Indian, Nagpuri language drama romance film directed by Ashwini Kumar and  produced by Alka Singh. The film feature Deepak Sinha and Payel Mukherjee in prominent roles.

Plot
The film focuses on the intense situation that develops in a man's village -Bharno in Jharkhand over the exploitation of farmers by money lenders and rescue mission of an educated son of a farmer.

Cast
Deepak Sinha
Chandan Kumar Jaiswal
Rishi Prakash Mishra
Payel Mukherjee
Varsha Rittu Lakra

Sound Track
Music Composer of film are Jaikant-Srikant. There are six songs in the film. The Singer Mitali Ghosh, Monika Mundu, Jyoti Sahu, Late Vishnu Nayak, Ravi Shankar Barwar, Rohan Dev Pathak have given their voice in these songs.

References

Nagpuri-language films